Kadets may refer to:

 Mikhail Kadets, mathematician
 Members of the Constitutional Democratic Party, a political party in the Russian Empire

See also
 Cadet (disambiguation)